Gastone Moschin (8 June 1929 – 4 September 2017) was an Italian stage, television and film actor.

Career
Born in San Giovanni Lupatoto (Veneto), Moschin graduated from the Accademia Nazionale di Arte Drammatica Silvio D'Amico and then began his career in the 1950s as a theatre actor, first with the Teatro Stabile in Genoa and then with the Piccolo Teatro di Milano in Milan. In the same period Moschin also began to appear in feature films and on television.

In his film career Moschin alternated character roles and, more rarely, leading roles, such as in Seven Times Seven and Caliber 9. His most famous role is that of Rambaldo Melandri in the Amici miei film series (1975–1985). He won two  Nastro d'Argento Awards for Best Supporting Actor, in 1967 for Pietro Germi's  The Birds, the Bees and the Italians and in 1986 for Nanni Loy's Amici miei – Atto III. Moschin is also well known for the role of Don Fanucci in Francis Ford Coppola's The Godfather Part II.

Death
Gastone Moschin was married to Marzia Ubaldi since 1970, he had one daughter (Emanuela Moschin). He died in hospital on 4 September 2017 from cardiomyopathy. He was 88.

Filmography

Cinema 

 The Rival (1956) as Marco Riccitelli
 Audace colpo dei soliti ignoti (1960) as Alfredo - Bookseller
 The Joy of Living (1961) as Priest
 Tiro al piccione (1962) as Pasquini
 Roaring Years (1962) as Carmine Passante
 L'amore difficile (1962) as Marshal (segment "Il serpente")
 The Reunion (1963) as Toro
 Il Fornaretto di Venezia (1963) as Counselor Garzone
 Il Successo (1963) as the brother in law of Giulio
 La visita (1963) as Renato Gusso
 Amore in quattro dimensioni (1964) as the husband (segment "Amore e vita")
 Extraconiugale (1964) as Luigi (episode "La doccia")
 100 Horsemen (1964) as Frate Carmelo
 Gentlemen of the Night (1964) as Doge Pietro Gradenigo
 Berlin, Appointment for the Spies (1965) as Boris
 Seven Golden Men (1965) as Adolf (the German)
 Seven Golden Men Strike Again (1965) as Adolf 
 The Birds, the Bees and the Italians (1966) as Osvaldo Bisigato
 Due killers in fuga (1966)
 Seasons of Our Love (1966) as Carlo Di Giusti aka Tancredi
 Sex Quartet (1966) as Dr. Aldini (segment "Fata Armenia")
 Diamonds Are a Man's Best Friend (1966)
 Top Crack (1966) as Karl
 The Oldest Profession (1967) as Flavius (segment "Nuits romaines, Les") 
 L'amore attraverso i secoli (1967) as Jo Laguerre
 Her Harem (1967) as Gianni
 Face to Face (1967) as Man at Puerto del Fuego (uncredited)
 Seven Times Seven (1968) as Benjamin Burton
 Italian Secret Service (1968) as lawyer Ramirez
 La notte è fatta per... rubare (1968)
 Sissignore (1968) as the lawyer
 La moglie giapponese (1968)
 Where Are You Going All Naked?' (1969) as President
 The Specialist (1969) as Sheriff
 The Conformist (1970) as Manganiello
 Mr. Superinvisible (1970) as Kokofrecovitch
 The Weekend Murders (1970) as Sgt. Aloisius Thorpe
 Ninì Tirabusciò: la donna che inventò la mossa (1970) as Mariotti the Chief of Policea
 Mio padre Monsignore (1971) as Don Alvaro
 Roma Bene (1971) as the monsignor
 Io non vedo, tu non parli, lui non sente (1971) as Metello Bottazzi
 Stanza 17-17 palazzo delle tasse, ufficio imposte (1971) as Giambattista Ranteghin
 The Sicilian Checkmate (1972) as Colonnesi, defense attorney
 Caliber 9 (1972) as Ugo Piazza
 Causa di divozio (1972) as Lawyer
 Don Camillo e i giovani d'oggi (1972) as Don Camillo
 Incensurato provata disonestà carriera assicurata cercasi (1972) as Giuseppe Zaccherin
 Fiorina la vacca (1972) as Ruzante
 The Assassination of Matteotti (1973) as Filippo Turati
 The Sensual Man (1973) as Uncle Edmondo
 Emergency Squad (1974) as Marsigliese
 Commissariato di notturna (1974) as Commissario Emiliano Borghini
 L'erotomane (1974) as Rodolfo Persichetti
 The Godfather Part II (1974) as Don Fanucci
 E cominciò il viaggio nella vertigine (1974) as Beilin
 Amici miei (1975) as Rambaldo Melandri
 A Woman at Her Window (1976) as Primoukis
 Wifemistress (1977) as Vincenzo
 Fearless (1978) as Karl Koper
 Lion of the Desert (1980) as Major Tomelli
 Si salvi chi vuole (1980)
 La compagna di viaggio (1980) as the baron
 Carlotta (1981) as Charlie
 Amici miei atto II (1982) as Rambaldo Melandri
 A Joke of Destiny (1983)
 Senza un attimo di respiro (1983) as Minister of the Interiors
 Amici miei – Atto III (1985) as Rambaldo Melandri
 A Thorn in the Heart (1986) as Dottor Trigona
 Rimini Rimini - Un anno dopo (1987) as Oreste Raccà
 Com'è dura l'avventura (1988) as Formigoni ("Vuò cumprà")
 Donne con le gonne (1991)
 Non chiamarmi Omar (1992) as Dr. Omar Tavoni
 We Free Kings (1996) as Don Gregorio
 La grande quercia (1997)
 Porzûs (1997) as old Geko 

 Television 
 Racconti garibaldini (1960)
 Operazione Vega (1962) as Sim
 Il mulino del Po (1963) as Fratognone
 I Miserabili (1964) as Jean Valjean
 Una coccarda per il re (1970) as Jacques Necker
 Le colonne della società (1972) as Karsten Bernick
 La morte di Danton (1972) as Danton
 Rosso veneziano (1976) as Marco Partibon
 Le uova fatali (1977) as Professor Pérsikov
 The Godfather: A Novel for Television (1977, uncredited) as Don Fanucci
 I racconti fantastici di Edgar Allan Poe (1979) as the Judge
 L'Andreana (1982) as Mondo
 Melodramma (1984) as Aldo Scotti
 Nel gorgo del peccato (1987) as Judge Ottavio Pica (1987)
 Les Ritals (1991) as Louvi
 L'avvocato delle donne (1996, episode "Laura") as Avv. Salvi
 Don Matteo (1999) as Bishop
 Sei forte Maestro (2000) as Vittorio Ricci
 Sei forte, Maestro 2 (2000) as Vittorio Ricci
 Don Matteo (2000) as Bishop 
 Don Matteo 2'' (2001) as Bishop (final appearance)

References

External links

1929 births
2017 deaths
People from the Province of Verona
Italian male film actors
Italian male television actors
Accademia Nazionale di Arte Drammatica Silvio D'Amico alumni
Nastro d'Argento winners
20th-century Italian male actors
Deaths from cardiomyopathy